Polygonum heterosepalum, common name dwarf desert knotweed or oddsepal knotweed, is a plant species native to the Great Basin Desert in southwestern Idaho, northern Nevada, northeastern California, and southwestern Oregon. It has been reported from 1 county in California (Modoc), 4 in Nevada (Washoe, Humboldt, Elko and Lander), 4 in Idaho (Owyhee, Twin Falls, Elmore and Gooding), and 5 in Oregon (Lake, Malheur, Harney, Grant and Crook). The species occurs in dry, open sites in sagebrush plains and pine woodlands.

Stems are green or red. Flowers are white, sometimes pink along margins, borne in groups of 2–3 in the axils of the leaves, slightly zygomorphic with some tepals longer than the others.

References

heterosepalum
Flora of the Western United States
Plants described in 1950
Flora without expected TNC conservation status